Zoltan Ilin (born 30 January 1955) is a Serbian former professional tennis player who competed for Yugoslavia.

Career
Ilin competed in the 1980 French Open but was unable to get past 13th seed Wojciech Fibak in the first round, losing in straight sets.

He played in seven Davis Cup ties for Yugoslavia from 1977 to 1981 and won eight of his 19 rubbers.

References

1955 births
Living people
Serbian male tennis players
Yugoslav male tennis players
Mediterranean Games silver medalists for Yugoslavia
Mediterranean Games bronze medalists for Yugoslavia
Mediterranean Games medalists in tennis
Competitors at the 1975 Mediterranean Games
Competitors at the 1979 Mediterranean Games